Harry McKay may refer to:
 Harry McKay (politician) (1925–1987), Canadian politician and judge
 Harry McKay (footballer) (born 1997), Australian footballer

See also
 Henry McKay (disambiguation)